Jim Power may refer to:

Games
 Jim Power in Mutant Planet, a 1992 platform game for the Amiga, Atari ST and Amstrad CPC
 Jim Power: The Lost Dimension in 3-D, a 1993 platform game

People
 Jim Power (economist), Chief Economist at Friends First and commentator in Ireland's media
 Jim Power (hurler) (1895–1998), Irish hurler for Galway
 Jim Power (Gaelic footballer), Irish Gaelic footballer